JKT48 is an Indonesian idol group whose name is derived from its based city of Jakarta and the Japanese idol group, AKB48. This is list awards received by JKT48:

Anugerah Dangdut Indonesia
First established in 2015 on MNCTV, the Anugerah Dangdut Indonesia are an annual dangdut music awards were giving to honour and recognized for talent singer/musician in dangdut field. JKT48 has received one award.

!
|-
| 2015
| JKT48
| Most Popular Dangdut Friend
| 
| 
|-

100% Ampuh Awards
The 100% Ampuh Awards are an awards ceremony were presented by 100% Ampuh and first established in 2013 on Global TV, to awarded for achievement artist who to be appreciated in music. JKT48 has received one award.

!
|-
| 2013
| JKT48
| Best Girlband
| 
| 
|-

Anugerah Musik Indonesia
The Anugerah Musik Indonesia (Indonesian translation: Indonesian Music Awards), is an annual Indonesian major music awards. They have been compared to the American Grammy Awards and British Brit Awards. The award was formalized in 1997 by ASIRI (Association of Indonesia Recording Industry), PAPPRI (Association of Indonesian Singers, Songwriters and Music Record Producers), and KCI (Copyright Office of Indonesia). It is the highest music awards given to outstanding artists in Indonesia. JKT48 has received two awards from 12 nominations.

!
|-
| rowspan= "2" | 2013
| rowspan= "3" | JKT48
| Best Pop Vocal Group
| 
| rowspan= "2" |
|-
| Best of the Best Newcomer
| 
|-
| rowspan= "2" | 2014
| Best Pop Vocal Group
| 
| rowspan= "2" |
|-
| "River"
| rowspan= "2" | Best Vocal Group Production Work
| 
|-
| rowspan= "2" | 2015
| "Papan Penanda Isi Hati"
| 
| rowspan= "2" |
|-
| rowspan= "2" | JKT48
| rowspan= "2" | Best Pop Vocal Group
| 
|-
| rowspan= "2" | 2016
| 
| rowspan= "2" |
|-
| "Hanya Lihat Kedepan"
| rowspan= "2" | Best Vocal Group Production Work
| 
|-
| rowspan= "2" | 2017
| "JKT Festival"
| 
|
|-
| JKT48
| Best Pop Vocal Group
| 
|
|-
| 2020
| "Rapsodi"
| rowspan= "2"| Best Vocal Group Production Work 
| 
| 
|-
| 2021
| "Cara Ceroboh untuk Mencinta (Darashinai Aishikata)"
| 
|

Bintang RPTI Awards

!
|-
| 2013
| JKT48 Missions
| Favorite Teen Television Show Program
| 
| 
|-
| 2014
| JKT48
| Favorite Star Advertisement
| 
| 
|-

Dahsyatnya Awards
First established in 2009, the Dahsyatnya Awards are annual music awards were presented by the daily Indonesian TV show Dahsyat, to honour for talent singer/musician who had appointed to be outstanding (Indonesian: Terdahsyat). JKT48 has received six awards from 8 nominations.

!
|-
| rowspan= "2" | 2013
| rowspan= "2" | JKT48
| Outstanding Newcomer
| 
| rowspan= "2" |
|-
| Outstanding Stage Act
| 
|-
| rowspan= "3" | 2014
| "River"
| Outstanding Song
| 
| rowspan= "3" |

|-
| rowspan= "5" | JKT48
| Outstanding Collaboration Duo/Group
| 
|-
| Outstanding Stage Act
| 
|-
| rowspan= "2" | 2015
| Outstanding Duo/Group
| 
| rowspan= "2" |
|-
| Outstanding Most Diligently Performance Artist
| 
|-
| 2016
| Outstanding Duo/Group
| 
|
|-

Global Seru Awards
The Global Seru Awards are awarded to celebrities who have caught the attention of the public through interesting or exciting accomplishments. JKT48 has received two awards.

!
|-
| rowspan= "2" | 2014
| JKT48
| Most Exciting Action Stage
| 
| rowspan= "2" |
|-
| "Fortune Cookie Yang Mencinta"
| Most Exciting Song
| 
|-

Hai Reader's Poll Music Awards
The Hai Reader's Poll Music Awards were created by Hai magazine on 2008, to recognized talent artist in music, based on voted by fans in website. JKT48 has received nine awards from 12 nominations.

!
|-
| rowspan= "5" | 2012
| "Heavy Rotation"
| Best Single
| 
| rowspan= "5" |
|-
| rowspan= "4" | JKT48
| Best Costume
| 
|-
| Best Stage Performance
| 
|-
| Best Freshmeat
| 
|-
| Best of the Best
| 
|-
| rowspan= "5" | 2013
| Perkenalkan, Nama Kami JKT48
| Best Concert
| 
| rowspan= "5" |
|-
| "Fortune Cookie Yang Mencinta"
| Best Single
| 
|-
| rowspan= "3" | JKT48
| Best Costume
| 
|-
| Best Freshmeat
| 
|-
| Best Stage Act
| 
|-
| 2014
| "Papan Penanda Isi Hati"
| rowspan= "2" | Best Single
| 
|
|-
| 2015
| "Halloween Night"
| 
|
|-

Indonesian Social Media Awards
Created in 2016 by SCTV, the Indonesian Social Media Awards is an annual award  for celebrities who have become trending topics in various social media.

!
|-
| 2016
| Melody JKT48
| Female Celeb Twitter
| 
| 
|-

JawaPos.com Group Awards
The JawaPos.com Readers Choice Awards was an online awards have first established in 2017 by newspaper Jawa Pos, to honour for public figure in music, film and entertainment. JKT48 has received two awards.

!
|-
| 2016
| rowspan= "2" | JKT48
| Best Group/Duo Singer
| 
|
|-
| 2017
| Favorite Group/Band
| 
|
|-

JPopAsia Music Awards
JPopAsia Music Awards is the largest online Asian music awards with its nominees picked by online community.

!
|-
| rowspan= "2" | 2012
| rowspan= "2" | "Heavy Rotation"
| Best Single
| 
| rowspan= "2" |
|-
| Best Music Video
| 
|-

KLIK! Awards
The KLIK! Awards was an awards ceremony were established in 2011 and presented by program KLIK!, to honour for artist and clip makers in music. JKT48 has received one award.

!
|-
| 2013
| "Heavy Rotation"
| Favorite Newcomer
| 
| 
|-

Mom & Kids Awards
First launched in 2016 by MNCTV, the Mom & Kids Awards are awards was appreciate for artists which have been inspiration from mother and kids. JKT48 has received two awards.

!
|-
| 2015
| rowspan= "2" | JKT48
| Favorite Group/Duo/Band
| 
|
|-
| 2016
| Favorite Idol Singer
| 
| 
|-

Nickelodeon Kids' Choice Awards

Nickelodeon Indonesia Kids' Choice Awards
Nickelodeon Indonesia Kids' Choice Awards is the Indonesian version of Nickelodeon Kids' Choice Awards, held since 2008 in Jakarta. JKT48 received three awards.

!
|-
| 2013
| rowspan= "3" | JKT48
| rowspan= "2" | Favorite Boyband/Girlband
| 
| 
|-
| 2014
| 
| 
|-
| 2015
| Favorite Group/Band/Duo
| 
| 
|-

Nickelodeon Kids' Choice Awards (U.S.)
Nickelodeon Kids' Choice Awards (U.S.) is an annual awards show that airs on the Nickelodeon cable channel, which airs live and is usually held and telecast live on a Saturday night in late March or early April, that honors the year's biggest television, movie, and music acts, as voted by Nickelodeon viewers. Winners receive a hollow orange blimp figurine. JKT48 has received one award.

!
|-
| 2015
| JKT48
| Favorite Asian Act
| 
| 
|-

Oz Radio Bandung FM Awards
The Oz Radio Bandung FM Awards are an online radio awards were presented by OZ Radio FM, for talent musician/singer who have listed of 'friendly' in music.

!
|-
| 2018
| JKT48
| Most Friendly Duo/Group Singer
| 
|
|-

Panasonic Gobel Awards
The Panasonic Gobel Awards is an annual award presented to television programs and individual, based on poll results. The poll was originally conducted by the Indonesian tabloid, Citra, but was taken over by Nielsen Media Research in 2004.

!
|-
| 2016
| JKT48 Ada Banyak Rasa
| Favorite Special Event
| 
|
|-

SCTV Awards
Presented by SCTV since 2001, the SCTV Awards are an annual awards have been presenting for talent artists who had to be most popular (Indonesian: Paling Ngetop) in entertainment, based on audience votes.

!
|-
| 2014
| JKT48
| Most Famous Boyband/Girlband
| 
|
|-

SCTV Music Awards
First established in 2003, the SCTV Music Awards are an annual music awards were presented by Indonesian TV station SCTV and have giving to honour for talent musician who had to be most popular (Indonesian: Ngetop), based on voting public through SMS.

!
|-
| 2013
| rowspan= "4" | JKT48
| Most Famous Girlband
| 
|
|-
| 2014
| rowspan= "3" | Most Famous Boyband/Girlband
| 
|
|-
| 2015
| 
|
|-
| 2016
| 
|
|-

Selebrita Awards
The Selebrita Awards are an awards ceremony were established in 2013 and presented by the same-title program, to awarded for celebrity in entertainment. JKT48 has received one award.

!
|-
| 2013
| JKT48
| Newcomer of the Year
| 
| 
|-

Showbiz Indonesia Awards

!
|-
| 2014
| JKT48
| Band/Group of the Year
| 
| 
|-

World Music Awards
The World Music Awards is an international awards show founded in 1989 under the patronage of Albert II, Prince of Monaco and based in Monte Carlo. Awards are presented to the world's best selling artist in various categories and to the best-selling artist from each major territory. Sales figures are provided by the International Federation of the Phonographic Industry. JKT48 has received three awards from 6 nominations.

!
|-
| rowspan= "6" | 2014
| "Fortune Cookie Yang Mencinta"
| World's Best Video
| 
| rowspan= "6" |
|-
| rowspan= "4" | JKT48
| World's Best Live Act
| 
|-
| World's Best Group
| 
|-
| World's Best Indonesian Group (Voted)
| 
|-
| World's Best Indonesian Live Act (Voted)
| 
|-
| "Fortune Cookie Yang Mencinta"
| World's Best Indonesian Video (Voted)
| 
|-

Yahoo! OMG Awards
The Yahoo! OMG Awards are an annual online awards were established on 2012 by Yahoo! Indonesia for celebrity in entertainment. JKT48 has received three awards from 5 nominations.

!
|-
| 2012
| rowspan= "3" | JKT48
| rowspan= "2" | Best Group
| 
| 
|-
| rowspan= "2" | 2013
| 
| rowspan= "2" |

|-
| Celeb with Most Die-Hard Fans
| 
|-
| rowspan= "2" | 2014
| Melody JKT48
| Most Wanted Female
| 
| rowspan= "2" |
|-
| Nabilah JKT48
| Teenage Idol Girl
| 
|-

References

Lists of awards received by Indonesian musician
Lists of awards received by musical group